Frank Pery Knox  (23 January 1880 – 1 February 1960) was an English first-class cricketer active 1899–1902 who played for Surrey He was born in Clapham, was educated at Dulwich College and Corpus Christi College, Oxford, and died in Hove. During World War I he was an officer in the Army Service Corps; along with many other officers he was awarded the DSO in the 1918 Birthday Honours "for services rendered in connection with Military Operations in France and Flanders."

References

1880 births
1960 deaths
English cricketers
Surrey cricketers
Oxford University cricketers
People educated at Dulwich College
Alumni of Corpus Christi College, Oxford
Royal Army Service Corps officers
British Army personnel of World War I
Military personnel from London